The 1974–75 season saw Rochdale compete in the Football League Fourth Division, following relegation the previous season.

Statistics
																				
																				

|}

Final League Table

Competitions

Football League Fourth Division

F.A. Cup

League Cup

References

Rochdale A.F.C. seasons
Rochdale